An annular solar eclipse occurred on May 9, 1948. A solar eclipse occurs when the Moon passes between Earth and the Sun, thereby totally or partly obscuring the image of the Sun for a viewer on Earth. An annular solar eclipse occurs when the Moon's apparent diameter is smaller than the Sun's, blocking most of the Sun's light and causing the Sun to look like an annulus (ring). An annular eclipse appears as a partial eclipse over a region of the Earth thousands of kilometres wide. Annularity was visible from Car Nicobar, the northernmost of the Nicobar Islands, and Burma, Thailand including Bangkok, French Indochina (the part now belonging to Laos), North Vietnam (now belonging to Vietnam), China, South Korea, Rebun Island in Japan, Kuril Islands in the Soviet Union (now belonging to Russia) on May 9th, and Alaska on May 8th. It was the first central solar eclipse visible from Bangkok from 1948 to 1958, where it is rare for a large city to witness 4 central solar eclipses in just 9.945 years. The moon's apparent diameter was only 0.006% smaller than the Sun's, so this was an annular solar eclipse that occurred on May 9, 1948. Occurring 7.1 days after apogee (Apogee on May 2, 1948) and 6.6 days before perigee (Perigee on May 15, 1948), the Moon's apparent diameter was near the average diameter.

The path width of the large annular solar eclipse of May 9, 1948 was about 200 meters and lasted only 0.3 seconds. A large annular eclipse covered over 99% of the Sun, creating a dramatic spectacle for observers in only an extremely narrow strip; however, it was fleeting, lasting just moments at the point of maximum eclipse.

Related eclipses

Solar eclipses 1946–1949

Saros 137 

It is a part of Saros cycle 137, repeating every 18 years, 11 days, containing 70 events. The series started with partial solar eclipse on May 25, 1389. It contains total eclipses from August 20, 1533 through December 6, 1695, first set of hybrid eclipses from December 17, 1713 through February 11, 1804, first set of annular eclipses from February 21, 1822 through March 25, 1876, second set of hybrid eclipses from April 6, 1894 through April 28, 1930, and second set of annular eclipses from May 9, 1948 through April 13, 2507. The series ends at member 70 as a partial eclipse on June 28, 2633. The longest duration of totality was 2 minutes, 55 seconds on September 10, 1569. Solar Saros 137 has 55 umbral eclipses from August 20, 1533 through April 13, 2507 (973.62 years).

Inex series

Tritos series

Metonic series

Notes

References

1948 5 9
1948 in science
1948 5 9
May 1948 events